Chatswood West is a suburb on the Lower North Shore of Sydney, in the state of New South Wales, Australia. Chatswood West is located 11 kilometres north-west of the Sydney central business district, in the local government areas of the City of Willoughby and City of Ryde. Chatswood is a separate suburb to the east. The locality of Chatswood located west of the Pacific Highway is informally known as West Chatswood, and should not be confused with the separate suburb of Chatswood West, nor should it be confused with the West Chatswood Post Office on Railway Street in the suburb of Chatswood. Chatswood West shares the same postcode as Chatswood which is 2067.

Chatswood West is located between the bigger suburbs of Chatswood and North Ryde. It straddles the Lane Cove River, occupying the valley flats and ridges leading down to the river.

History
Chatswood is believed to be named after the pet name "Chat" of the second wife of Richard Harnett (a pioneer of the district) and the original "wooded" nature of the area.

Chatswood West played a part in a famous Australian mystery, with the bodies of Dr Gilbert Bogle and Mrs Margaret Chandler being discovered on the banks of the Lane Cove River, 70 metres south of Fullers Bridge, on 1 January 1963.

Chatswood West split off from Chatswood to become a separate suburb on 20 January 2006. Chislehurst was a large historic house on Centennial Avenue.

Commercial area
Chatswood West is mainly residential, with small commercial areas on Fullers Road.

Houses
The residential buildings are overwhelmingly detached houses. The average house price in Chatswood West is $1,740,000 in 2016, and the average rental price is $700 per week. Many houses within Chatswood West, especially those in Greville Street, Colwell Crescent and Mooney Street look onto Chatswood Golf Club.

Schools
Chatswood West is served by Chatswood High School and Chatswood Public School. Nearby schools also include Mowbray Public School, which is located in Lane Cove North.

Facilities 
Facilities within Chatswood West includes Chatswood Golf Club.

Transport
Chatswood railway station is a major station on the North Shore railway line of the Sydney Trains network, and is also serviced by the Sydney Metro Northwest which opened in 2018.

There are regular buses that connect the area with the Chatswood CBD, and other suburbs such as Parramatta. The main bus routes that connect Chatswood to Chatswood West are routes 255 and 256, operated by Busways.

Population

Demographics
According to the 2016 census, there were 1,499 residents in Chatswood West. 57.9% of people were born in Australia. The next most common country of birth was China at 9.3%.  67.7% of people only spoke English at home. Other languages spoken at home included Mandarin at 11.2%. The most common responses for religion in Chatswood West were No Religion 36.5%, Catholic 21.2% and Anglican 13.0%.

Notable residents
 Kenneth Slessor - poet, lived on the west side of the Pacific Highway
 Roger Woodward - pianist, lived on Peckham Street
 Errol Flynn - movie star, lived on McLean Avenue
 Tony Abbott - former prime minister of Australia, lived on West Parade

Parks
There are a number of parks and forest reserves such as Ferndale Park. There are walking tracks and a golf course. There are two entrances to Lane Cove National Park from Chatswood West, one on Lady Game Drive, and one on Delhi Road, next to Fullers Bridge.

Noteworthy indigenous flora includes the blackbutt, tree heath, celery wood, coachwood, native crabapple and hard corkwood. Ferns include jungle brake, fishbone water fern, filmy fern and necklace fern.

Fauna includes powerful owl, barking owl, Australian king parrot, brush turkey, eastern whipbird, satin bowerbird, eastern water dragon, emerald spotted frog, enamelled spider, red triangle slug, blue planarian, long-nosed bandicoot and marsupial mouse.

References

 
Suburbs of Sydney